(Herbert) Thorndike Shaw was an Anglican priest in  the mid twentieth century.

He was educated at Keble College, Oxford; and ordained in 1927. After a curacies in Byker, Whitley Bay and Newcastle he was Vicar of Copmanthorpe from 1932 until 1937. He was Archdeacon of Grenada from 1937 to 1945
when he returned to England to be Rector of Wokingham.

References

Alumni of Keble College, Oxford
Archdeacons of Grenada
Anglo-Catholic clergy